Greek letter society effect on youth identity happens at a time when students being to explore and experiment to discover who they are. Greek letter societies include Greek letter organizations, sororities, fraternities, and Greek life. Members join while enrolled in tertiary education. These organizations primarily consist of solely all women or all men. Members of a Greek letter society share collective goals and understandings of the organization's requirements, rituals, and relationships. Membership is generally focused within the undergraduate education, where many students begin to explore and experiment within different experiences, but also requires a lifetime commitment to the society.

Greek letter societies, with their emphasis on member relations, provide a platform for members to create their own identity through the organization. Identity creation for those are transitioning to a new chapter of their life, like undergraduate students, relies heavily on who you interact with and who you build relationships with. Greek letter organizations offer opportunities for incoming students to interact with, and create relationships with, diverse individuals to mold their identity.

Greek letter societies also require a monetary commitment through the payment of member dues, bringing in the factor of privilege into the organizations. Being surrounded and bonded by others who also share, most likely, very similar classes, family situations, and financial commitments can affect how youths' identities are created in this transitional period. This causes more unanimity within the chapters, and Greek life as a whole, as only those who have the privilege to both attend secondary education and pay their organization's dues.

In addition to class, racial factors within Greek letter organizations play a large role in how identity can be created. In conjunction with class, Greek life among college students in North America consists primarily of Caucasian members. Certain chapters only accept members of a particular race or heritage. This adds to the unanimity that class and privilege creates, causing members to be only surrounded by those primarily of their lifestyle.

While Greek letter organizations started in and are primarily active in the United States, there are also international chapters in Canada, the United Kingdom, and the Philippines. The root traditions for Greek letter Organizations are generally constant around the world, but do have different demographics and traditions. College education differentiates between countries and continents, but many of the Greek traditions of chapters remain constant such as rituals and greetings. Comparing North American and international Greek chapters differentiates American traditions and international expectations.

Greek Life and Relationship Building

Bonds 
Greek letter organizations rely heavily on the relationship among its members, both active and alumni. Through practices that bring the chapter together as a whole, fraternities and sororities place emphasis upon the bond that is created through their shared Greek affiliation. These bonds are created through educational, social, and ritualistic bonds that build the relationships. Educational practices of these bonding practices can consist of the academic demands of membership in Greek Letter organizations. With pressure from higher education in itself and academic standards, such as a minimal grade point average requirement, members have the support of their fellow members who are also under similar pressures of success to bond and create relationships with. Members also are able to create mutual relationships over their coursework or availability to study aids within the chapter. Social practices such as sisterhoods or brotherhoods bring the chapter together as a whole, not as individual members or pledge classes. These consist of both non-alcoholic and alcoholic events that allow the members to build better relationships within the chapter. Members, foremost and most concretely, are bonded through their organization's ritualistic practices. Through pledge processes, initiation, and chapter rituals throughout membership, the members hold ritualistic practices that are, in most cases, unique and confidential within the chapter. Holding these secretive and unique practices gives the members a shared bond that transcends all other social or academic bonds.

Learning is created in an environment where there is a constant emphasis upon interpersonal relationships, such as a collegiate Greek letter organization. Interacting with people on a consistent basis allows for a broader exposure to different world views, educational practices, and opinions that transforms a dualistic perception of the world to one that understands multiplicity of perspectives and a larger schematic threshold. Greek letter organizations provides the basis for these worldly understandings to flourish since they provide the relationships needed. These changes that are evident in relationship building
that continue to be influential into early adulthood.

Relationships in Identity Creation 
Relationship building is a component to identity creation in young adults. Attending college is the next step for many privileged high school students when transitioning into adulthood. Prior to college, young people who attend rely more heavily upon their parents or parental figures for guidance through difficult transitions or stressful life situations. As young people begin to take on more responsibilities that are linked with adult life, they transition from relying on their parents to relying on their peers. These relationships include friendships and romantic relationships. These relationships, and their quality, become a factor in how young adults create their identity, and use them to transition into adulthood. The greater support accumulated from peer relationships allowed for flourishing academics, greater mental health, and more confidence in self characteristics.  The quality of peer relationships has been seen as a sign of how well the student is adjusting to college and their next steps into life. Greek letter organizations give students an option to create or seek out these relationships at an early, and vulnerable step in their new journey. But, these relationships created at such an infantile stage in their development can also cause student to adopt values and perceptions that may not have surfaced without the influence of their fraternity brothers or sorority sisters.

Class and Privilege

Monetary Commitments 

Greek organizations require a monetary commitment for membership with the requirement to pay dues. While varying across locales, they generally include chapter fees, national dues, and sometimes social or facility charges. Outside of the member payments, other costs exist. Social events, including appropriate clothes, night-life, Greek "family" gifts, and letter apparel all are optional, but additional costs. While they are not mandatory, they are seen as part of the Greek culture, and can then cause pressure for members who can not afford all of the extra expenses. These financial burdens can deter lower income college students from joining a chapter. College level extra-curricular involvement statistics within United States Greek membership saw 79% of its members as being in the Upper Middle Class.

Greek membership does not require a certain income or social class to join, allowing its lower income members to still be involved despite monetary obligations. One study found that 82% of the working class students worked part-time jobs while 36% were still involved in Greek life. Scholarships are available to members based on their academics and membership. Both nationally, and regionally, alumni will donate to scholarship funds for members who may struggle with the financial aspect of membership.

Class and Identity Creation 
Socioeconomic class has an effect on how an individual's identity is created. Because it is based heavily upon the social class and wealth of parents, young people generally have little mobility while in their youth to change their social class. Social class, both high and low, affects the future of youth. For many, it outlines what their future may hold and the availability of opportunity. College education, in itself, is a privilege because of increasing costs. As expectations inflate, more is needed to just meet bare-minimum requirements for success, and a college education has progressively become a norm, instead of a privilege. Upper middle class students in higher education were also more likely to be involved in internships and off-campus studies in conjunction with Greek Life. Factoring in, as well, the opportunities that can arise from being involved in Greek life, such as job opportunities, networking opportunities, and employment through the organization, socioeconomic class becomes a determiner in later success in life Greek letter organizations provide connections to members across the world, including the United States, Canada, the United Kingdom, and the Philippines. Members. Members are automatically connected to active and alumni members of their own chapters, and of any Greek letter organization across the world. Members' connections gained through these privileged organizations offers opportunities and potential for success outside of just merit based success. Class, in its ability to gain these connections, begins, then, to offer success in life, no longer just relying on merit or advances through individual improvement.

Race and Culture

Greek letter organizations welcome in an race or culture in their organizations. Because they are national organizations, they are not legally able to discriminate against a potential new member's race or culture. Because race and class are so closely linked when looking at privileged organizations like Greek life, the two both affect the membership. Just like class causes potential new members to be discouraged because of cost or financial pressures, those who do not fit the majority race of Greek letter organizations can also feel discouraged from joining. In the United States, African American youth have lower educational opportunities, creating the gap between races. Since they are primarily affiliated with upper-middle class members, Greek letter organizations are also affiliated with Caucasian members, since lower income can be linked to those of color.

Greek letter organizations are a primarily a Caucasian institution on college campuses. While they may not be outwardly discriminatory, historical links to Caucasian participation in Greek letter organizations causes a racial divide in members and non members. Members of different cultural backgrounds, such as women and men of Asian or Latino descent, may feel excluded or marginalized with the unanimity found in many chapters.

Black Greek Letter Organizations 

While many Greek letter organizations allow for any race or culture to be accepted, there are also specific organizations that affiliate with a specific race or culture. These organizations seek to fill the racial gap among black involvement in Greek life in college. Black Greek Letter Organizations (BGLO's)are Greek life specifically for those who identify as African American. These organizations are not known as prominently as traditional Greek letter organizations, but consist of many similar attributes such as pledging, sisterhood/brotherhood, hazing, and ritual. The National Panhellenic Council recognizes nine BGLO's, referred to as the "Divine Nine", including:Alpha Phi Alpha fraternity, Alpha Kappa Alpha sorority, Kappa Alpha Psi fraternity, Omega Psi Phi fraternity, Delta Sigma Theta sorority, Phi Beta Sigma fraternity, Zeta Phi Beta sorority, Sigma Gamma Rho sorority, and Iota Phi Theta fraternity.

Black Greek letter organizations hold many of the same expectations and experiences as predominantly white organizations including their recruitment process, involvement in Greek life as a community, and societal norms like hosting parties for other members of the Greek community to partake in. BGLO’s face different arrangements and expectations than of the predominantly white Greek letter organizations. BGLO’s have less access to economical resources such as Greek houses and alumni endowments that many other organizations base large portions of their identity upon. These limited resources create a larger divide between white and black Greek letter organization, deepening the institutional unanimity. BGLO’s also face much higher reputational constraints than predominantly white organizations. There are generally fewer BGLO’s on college campuses than predominantly white organizations, increasing their visibility among students, staff, and media. Members much be more conscious of their decisions and actions, lacking the higher anonymity that predominantly white Greek letter societies hold.

Along with the BGLO, the National AIPA Panhellenic association, consists of sororities with members who come from Asian Pacific Islander cultures.

International Greek Letter Societies

Greek letter organizations started in the United States, and have been the most prominently publicized and known within the American culture. Many chapters within the United States have expanded internationally, expanding American culture and prompting new, non-American Greek letter organizations to charter in respective countries.

Greek Life in the Philippines 
The Philippines has chartered many chapters of Greek letter organizations at their universities. They have both American chapters chartered in their country, as well as new lettered organizations in just their country. These chapters mirror American Greek letter organizations with the cultural importance and competition between chapters.

Greek Life in Canada 
Some of the first chapters to be chartered internationally were instituted in Canada, with Zeta Psi being the first at the University of Toronto. These chapters were deemed similar to the American chapters based on their size, reputation, and exclusivity. McGill University in Canada also holds Greek letter organizations, many of the same as the University of Toronto, but hold less weight and campus involvement as many of their American Chapters.

The Greek organizations on Canadian campuses hold similar effects to American Greek letter organizations. In a student's first year in college, they will have a higher GPA after being involved in on-campus organizations, like Greek letter societies. Students who are involved in these organizations have more support and are able to gain resources more easily, broadening their intellectual and social education. But, like in American Greek life, involvement also creates opportunity for over-exertion and detrimental involvement in activities such as binge-drinking and bar presence. Both negative and positive forms of involvement have large influences on a youth's changing identity in college.

Many American chartered Greek letter organizations, such as Kappa Alpha Theta, have international chapters in Canada.

See also 
 Fraternities and sororities#Secrecy and ritual
 Fraternity
 BGLO

References